Pieter "Piet" Bouman (October 14, 1892 in Dordrecht – July 20, 1980 in Tietjerksteradeel) was a Dutch amateur football player who competed in the 1912 Summer Olympics.

Club career
Bouman played for hometown side DFC, as well as for Haarlem, U.D. and Voorwaarts Leerdam.

International career
Bouman made his debut for the Netherlands in a June 1912 Summer Olympics match against Austria and earned a total of 9 caps, scoring no goals. His final international was a May 1914 friendly match against Denmark. He won the bronze medal with the Dutch at the 1912 Summer Olympics football tournament.

Personal life
He worked as a civil servant for the Zwolle, Deventer and Leerdam municipalities.

References

External links
 
 
 

1892 births
1980 deaths
Footballers from Dordrecht
Association football fullbacks
Dutch footballers
Netherlands international footballers
Footballers at the 1912 Summer Olympics
Olympic footballers of the Netherlands
Olympic bronze medalists for the Netherlands
Olympic medalists in football
FC Dordrecht players
HFC Haarlem players
Medalists at the 1912 Summer Olympics